Gerrhopilus is a genus of snakes in the family Gerrhopilidae.

Geographic range
The 23 species of the genus Gerrhopilus are found in South Asia, Southeast Asia, and Melanesia.

Species
Gerrhopilus addisoni 
Gerrhopilus andamanensis 
Gerrhopilus ater 
Gerrhopilus beddomii 
Gerrhopilus bisubocularis 
Gerrhopilus ceylonicus 
Gerrhopilus depressiceps 
Gerrhopilus eurydice 
Gerrhopilus floweri 
Gerrhopilus fredparkeri 
Gerrhopilus hades 
Gerrhopilus hedraeus 
Gerrhopilus inornatus 
Gerrhopilus lestes 
Gerrhopilus manilae 
Gerrhopilus mcdowelli 
Gerrhopilus mirus 
Gerrhopilus oligolepis 
Gerrhopilus persephone 
Gerrhopilus sumatranus 
Gerrhopilus suturalis 
Gerrhopilus thurstoni 
Gerrhopilus tindalli 

Nota bene: A binomial authority in parentheses indicates that the species was originally described in a genus other than Gerrhopilus.

References

External links

 
Snake genera